Carlos Manuel Urzúa Macías (b. June 9, 1955 Aguascalientes) is a  Mexican Professor of Economics at the Tecnológico de Monterrey, Mexico City and Santa Fe campuses. He is a National Researcher and a member of the Mexican Academy of Science. He served as the Secretary of Finance for the Mexico City government from 2000 to 2003. He is also an award-winning poet.

In 2018 President Andrés Manuel López Obrador appointed Urzúa Secretariat of Finance and Public Credit. But less than a year in the job Urzúa quit citing strong differences with the President's policies.

Career
Urzúa earned a bachelor's degree from the Tecnológico de Monterrey in 1975, and a master's degree from Cinvestav in 1978, both in Mathematics. He earned a Ph D in Economics from the University of Wisconsin-Madison in 1986. Urzúa began his teaching career at the Tecnológico de Monterrey, State of Mexico campus, at the age of 22. He was an assistant professor in the Economics Department at Georgetown University (1986-1988), and a visiting assistant professor in the Woodrow Wilson School at Princeton University (1988-1990). He was a professor in the Economics Department at the Colegio de México from 1989 to 2000.

From 2000 to 2003, he was appointed Secretary of Finance for the Mexico City government under then mayor Andrés Manuel López Obrador. In 2003, Urzúa left government to found the Escuela de Graduados en Administración Pública y Política Pública, a public policy graduate school at the Tecnológico de Monterrey, Mexico City campus, which he directed for ten years.

Aside from his more theoretical work, Urzúa has written extensively on many aspects of the Mexican economy: fiscal policy, monetary policy, tax reform, poverty, economic competition, international trade, fiscal federalism, and economic history. He has worked over the years as a consultant to the World Bank, the United Nations Economic Commission for Latin America and the Caribbean, the United Nations Development Programme and  the Organisation for Economic Co-operation and Development. He has also advised Mexican firms on international trade issues.

Publications

Books
 C. M. Urzúa (1991), El déficit del sector público y la política fiscal en México, 1980-1989, Santiago de Chile: Naciones Unidas.
 C. M. Urzúa (2000), Medio siglo de relaciones entre el Banco Mundial y México: Una reseña desde el trópico, Mexico City: El Colegio de México.
 C. M. Urzúa (2002), Recuerdan los muertos, Mexico City: Tintanueva.
 C. M. Urzúa (2002), Ejercicios de teoría microeconómica, Mexico City: El Colegio de México.
 C. M. Urzúa (2006), Política social para la equidad, co-editor with L. F. López-Calva and E. Ortiz, Mexico City: Porrúa.
 C. M. Urzúa (2009), Pobreza en México: Magnitud y perfiles, co-editor with R. Aparicio and V. Villarespe, Mexico City: Grupo Edición-CONEVAL-UNAM-ITESM.
 C. M. Urzúa (2011), Sistemas de impuestos y prestaciones en América Latina, co-editor with L. F. López-Calva, Puebla: BUAP-IDRC-ITESM-PNUD.
 C. M. Urzúa (2012), Fiscal inclusive development: Microsimulation models for Latin America, editor, Mexico City: IDRC-ITESM-PNUD.
 C. M. Urzúa (2012), Construyendo el futuro de México: Propuestas de políticas públicas, co-editor with T. Almaguer and H. Moreira, Monterrey: ITESM.
 C. M. Urzúa (2014), Criaturas vistas o soñadas: Adivinanzas, Mexico City: Magenta Ediciones.

Academic Articles and Chapters
 Google Scholar profile

References

Living people
1955 births
Mexican economists
Mexican Secretaries of Finance
Academic staff of the Monterrey Institute of Technology and Higher Education
Monterrey Institute of Technology and Higher Education alumni
University of Wisconsin–Madison alumni
21st-century Mexican politicians
Politicians from Aguascalientes
People from Aguascalientes City
Cabinet of Andrés Manuel López Obrador